Stuart Grant Macdougall (born 1 June 1947) is a former Australian Rugby Union player who represented for the Wallabies eight times.

Early life
Macdougall was born in Sydney and attended Newington College (1955–1966). He played his early club Rugby with St George.

Representative career
At the age of twenty-three, MacDougall was selected to represent New South Wales against Queensland. The following year he played in his first test match against  against a back drop of anti-apartheid demonstrations. On this occasion he marked the Springbok captain Hannes Marais. He toured England in 1973–74 and played three tests against  in 1974. He played his three final tests against England, two at home in 1975 and once on the 1975-76 Australia rugby union tour of Britain and Ireland.

His brother Graeme was also an Australian rugby union representative player whose club career was played at St George.

References

1947 births
Living people
Australian rugby union players
Rugby union props
People educated at Newington College
Australia international rugby union players
MacDougall family
Rugby union players from Sydney